The Indonesian shortsnout spurdog (Squalus hemipinnis) is a dogfish described in 2007. It is a member of the family Squalidae, found off Indonesia.

References

Squalus
Fish of Indonesia
Taxa named by William Toby White
Taxa named by Peter R. Last
Taxa named by Gordon K. Yearsley
Fish described in 2007